Fadiga is a surname. Notable people with the surname include:

Bandiougou Fadiga (born 2001), French footballer
Khalilou Fadiga (born 1974), Senegalese footballer
Luciano Fadiga (born 1961), Italian neurophysiologist
Noah Fadiga (born 1999), Belgian footballer
Sékou Fadiga (born 1988), Ivorian footballer